Mujhe Meri Biwi Se Bachaao (translation:Save me from my wife) is a 2001 Indian film directed by Harry Baweja. It stars Rekha and Naseeruddin Shah.

Cast 
 Rekha as Kamini Mathur
 Naseeruddin Shah as Anand Mathur
 Arshad Warsi as Rocky
 Suman Ranganathan as Anuradha
 Suresh Chatwal as Vakharia
 Mukul Dev as Monty
 Mushtaq Khan as Natwarlal
 Tiku Talsania as Malkani
 Priyanka Trivedi as Sonia Malkani

Production
Rekha was to portray an obese woman and used padding for her role. Some of her scenes had Reshma Pathan as her body double. It also marked the first time in twenty years that Rekha was doing a comedy film. She had previously done one in Khubsoorat (1980). Producer Mehra commented that she had done a "wonderful job of losing and gaining weight".

This film is a remake of the 1986 American comedy Ruthless People starring Danny DeVito and Bette Midler, but had a different climax. It also marked the first time Shah and Arshad Warsi appeared in the same film and the last film produced by Prakash Mehra.

Songs
"Nach Meri Jaan Nach Nach" - Hema Sardesai, Sukhwinder Singh
"Tere Ishq Ka Jadu" - Sukhwinder Singh, Jaspinder Narula
"Kahoji Tumse Acha Kaun Hai" - Sonu Nigam, Anaida
"Diwane Yu Hi Nahi Aa Gaye" - Sunidhi Chauhan, Sukhwinder Singh
"Zara Thehro" - Alka Yagnik, Udit Narayan

Reception
In his review for Bollywood Hungama, the film critic Taran Adarsh gave the film a one-star rating out of a maximum five while calling it an "absolute letdown". India Today described it as a "B-grade slapstick".

References

External links

2000s Hindi-language films
Films scored by Rajesh Roshan
Films directed by Harry Baweja
Indian remakes of American films